Charles Macon England (September 6, 1921 – January 23, 1999) was an American Negro league pitcher in the 1940s.

A native of Newton, North Carolina, England played for the Newark Eagles during their 1946 Negro World Series championship season. England died in Salisbury, North Carolina in 1999 at age 77.

References

External links
 and Seamheads

1921 births
1999 deaths
Newark Eagles players
Baseball pitchers
Baseball players from North Carolina
People from Newton, North Carolina
20th-century African-American sportspeople